Mindaugas Grigaravičius (born 15 July 1992) is a Lithuanian professional footballer who plays as a winger for FK Trakai.

In January 2023 became a member of FC Kaisar.

International career
Mindaugas Grigariavičius first call-up to the senior Lithuania squad came in August 2016 for the World Cup qualifiers against Slovenia. He made his national team debut coming as substitute on 70th minute against Slovenia in the World Cup qualifier on 4 September 2016.

References

External links
 

1992 births
Living people
Association football midfielders
Lithuanian footballers
FK Jelgava players
Lithuania international footballers
FK Sūduva Marijampolė players
FK Utenis Utena players
FC Stumbras players
FS METTA/Latvijas Universitāte players
FK Jonava players
FK Riteriai players
Lithuanian expatriate footballers
Expatriate footballers in Latvia